Cathy Cox is a Canadian provincial politician, who was elected as the Member of the Legislative Assembly of Manitoba for the riding of River East in the 2016 election. She is a member of the Progressive Conservative Party of Manitoba (PCs). She held the riding for the party after incumbent MLA Bonnie Mitchelson did not stand for re-election.

On 3 May 2016, when the PC government was officially sworn in, Cox was appointed to the Executive Council of Manitoba as Minister of Sustainable Development.

On 17 August 2017, Cox was named Minister of Sport, Culture and Heritage.

She was re-elected for Kildonan-River East in the 2019 provincial election, the first after the decennial electoral redistribution that occurred the previous year.

References

Living people
Politicians from Winnipeg
Progressive Conservative Party of Manitoba MLAs
Members of the Executive Council of Manitoba
Women MLAs in Manitoba
Women government ministers of Canada
21st-century Canadian women politicians
Year of birth missing (living people)